Ålvundeid is a former municipality in Møre og Romsdal county, Norway.  The  municipality existed from 1899 until its dissolution in 1960.  It had one of the smallest municipal populations in Norway.  It was located in the northern part of the present-day Sunndal Municipality.  The old municipality included the Innerdalen valley and the Ålvund valley area.  The administrative centre was the village of Ålvundeidet, also where the Ålvundeid Church is located.

History
The municipality of Ulvundeid was established on 1 January 1899 when it was split off from Øksendal municipality. The new municipality had an initial population of 462, making it one of the smallest municipalities in the county.  The name was later changed to Ålvundeid.  During the 1960s, there were many municipal mergers across Norway due to the work of the Schei Committee. On 1 January 1960, Ålvundeid Municipality (population: 513) was merged with Øksendal Municipality (population: 497) and Sunndal Municipality (population: 5,851) to form a new, larger Sunndal Municipality.

Government
The municipal council  of Ålvundeid was made up of 13 representatives that were elected to four year terms.  The party breakdown of the final municipal council was as follows:

See also
List of former municipalities of Norway

References

Sunndal
Former municipalities of Norway
1899 establishments in Norway
1960 disestablishments in Norway